The Kebar Valley (Indonesian: Lembah Kebar) is a large pleistocene/holocene intermontane valley found in the north central region of the Bird's Head Peninsula in the province of Southwest Papua. The nearest major village to the valley is Saukorem. This has created many villages throughout the area, leading to a growing rice production in the central and eastern regions of the valley.

Geography
The valley floor is leveled and gently tilted to three degrees, providing a division between the Arfak Mountains in the south, and the Tamrau Mountains in the north. 
Along its margins are several small alluvial cones, and terrace remnants of high level lake or alluvial deposits that rest along the north side of the valley. The major drainage area is the Kasi River. However, the Api River and Apriri River are two other rivers that cross this valley and supply water to the southeast lowland swamp areas. Primary fauna found in the valley is the Rusa Deer (Cervus timorensis), which are mostly found close to the flat regions of the central and eastern parts of the valley, encompassing the grassland and forest regions. However, it is common to find the deer across the grassland, looking for shelter in the hilly forests of the western regions of the valley. This hilly grassland area can be described as the pathway of water from highland areas to the flatland areas flowing to the east through the gullies. The physical characteristic of the soil in the Kebar Valley has been described as sandy in texture with little coherence structure in the central and western regions, along with a sandy clay loam in coherent plastic bolus structure along the eastern region.

Climate
Encompassing the Vogelkop montane rain forests ecoregion, the Kebar Valley has a tropical savanna climate, characterized mostly by its tall grass fields and broadleaf forests. The weather in the valley is subject to seasonal influence of the northwest monsoon from November to March, and the southeast trade winds from June to September. Limited meteorological observations indicate a relatively dry season for half of the year along the northern and central part of the valley, especially when the trade winds are blowing from the southeast. Rainfall is high throughout the Kebar Valley, with an average up to  annually. Relative humidity is also uniformly high in the valley, ranging from 80 to 100 percent. Morning clouds and ground fog may hamper aircraft operations in regions surrounding the valley during dry season.

Demographics

The Kebar Valley is home to the Karoon, Abun, Dore and the Wabia people who made their main home in the village of Saukorem. The growing populations in the valley resulted from Christian missionaries that moved through this region of the Bird's Head Peninsula. The people living here are reported to have children not only with partners of other families, but with cousins and distant relatives which may affect the parent's views of which children are truly "biological" or not. The people of the valley, Saukorem and this region of the Bird's Head Peninsula are said to produce wooden figures which are known as Korwar figures. They are often made with glass beads for eyes and a neckband made of bark-cloth and with the skulls of deceased family members. The Korwar figures in particular which are made with skulls are said to provide an abode for spirits of the departed and are believed to safeguard the vital force which is contained within the skull of the deceased. The locals are also known for producing bark-cloth.

Resources
Grazing habitat of Rusa Deer (Cervus timorensis) in the Kebar Valley. Accessed 5 March 2015
WWF Bird Watching on Bird's Head, and the Threats to the Region Vogelkop Montane Rain Forests. Accessed 5 March 2015
Arfak Mountains: Birding Hotspot of West Papua Accessed 5 March 2015

References

Landforms of Western New Guinea
Landforms of Southwest Papua 
Western New Guinea
Southwest Papua 
Valleys of Indonesia